The Bella Coola Music Festival takes place in the month of July in Bella Coola, British Columbia, Canada. It offers a diverse line-up of music: roots, rock, world, blues, folk and more.

History
The Festival began in 1998 when a small group of volunteers felt it would be a joyful way to get the valley's residents together and the Discovery Coast Music Festival, as it was first known, was born. Since then, the festival has grown into a widely respected event, incorporating many well-known performers into the line-up, while encouraging local talent and youth to participate in all aspects of its production.

References

External links
 Bella Coola Music Festival

Music festivals in British Columbia
July events
1998 establishments in British Columbia
Recurring events established in 1998